William Wales may refer to:

William, Prince of Wales (born 1982), elder son of Charles III and Diana, Princess of Wales
William Wales (astronomer) (1734?–1798), British astronomer and mathematician
William W. Wales (1818–1902), Minnesota politician

See also
William Walls (disambiguation)